Jack Ross "Jacky" Lee (July 11, 1938 – May 2, 2016) was an American quarterback who played professional football in the American Football League for all ten of its seasons (1960–1969). After playing football, baseball, and basketball at Ellet High School in Akron, Ohio, he played college football at the University of Cincinnati. In 1958–1959, Jacky Lee was the team MVP and an All Conference Quarterback. In 1960, he was MVP of the Senior Bowl.

AFL career
In 1960, he was the first quarterback ever drafted by the American Football League's Houston Oilers, where he split time with George Blanda in the Oilers' 1960 and 1961 AFL Championship seasons. In 1961, Lee threw for 457 yards against the Boston Patriots, then an AFL record, and set another league record with a 98-yard touchdown to Willard Dewveall against the Chargers. Lee and Blanda combined to throw 38 touchdowns for the Oilers in 1961. Lee played in every game for the Oilers from 1961 to 1963.

In 1964, he was the first and only player to ever be "lend-leased" to another team. He was loaned to the Denver Broncos and returned to the Oilers two years later. While in Denver, Lee threw for 370 yards in one half against the Oakland Raiders. 

In 1967, Lee was traded to the Kansas City Chiefs after four games. He spent most of his last three years as the back-up to Len Dawson with the Chiefs. He was part of the 1969 AFL and World Championship (Super Bowl IV) winning team.

He was one of only twenty men who played in each of the ten years of the AFL's existence.

After football
Lee retired in 1970 after a shoulder injury. He went on to have a successful career in commercial real estate in Houston.

Lee died on May 2, 2016, due to complications from Alzheimer's disease.

See also
 Other American Football League players

References

External links
 

1938 births
2016 deaths
Players of American football from Minneapolis
American football quarterbacks
Cincinnati Bearcats football players
Houston Oilers players
Denver Broncos (AFL) players
Kansas City Chiefs players
American Football League players